Pliomelaena translucida is a species of tephritid or fruit flies in the genus Pliomelaena of the family Tephritidae.

Distribution
Sri Lanka.

References

Tephritinae
Insects described in 1942
Diptera of Asia